Simon de Cramaud  (c. 1345 – 19 January 1423, in Poitiers) was a Catholic bishop, titular Latin Patriarch of Alexandria, and cardinal during the Great Western Schism of the fourteenth and fifteenth centuries.

Simon was born before 1360 near Rochechouart, Haute-Vienne, a younger son in a family of minor nobles. He studied law at Orléans and became a well-known canonist.  Simon taught canon law at the University of Paris, attracting the attention of John, Duke of Berry, one of the uncles of King Charles VI of France.  As a counselor of the duke, Simon performed both administrative and diplomatic tasks. In 1382, he was appointed Bishop of Agen, but was transferred to Béziers in 1383, and finally to Poitiers in 1385.  He was also appointed to Sens in 1390, but never occupied the see – instead he became the titular Latin Patriarch of Alexandria and Administrator of the Diocese of Avignon the following year. In 1409, he was made Archbishop of Reims and subsequently a cardinal in 1413. From then until his death, he served as the administrator of the Diocese of Poitiers.

Cramaud was a prominent figure in the struggles of the fourteenth-century church, and a partisan of the Avignon Papacy.  He championed Avignon Pope Clement VII, but fought Clement's successor, Benedict XIII, any way he could. He presided at the Council of Pisa in 1409, and proclaimed the deposition of both Gregory XII and Benedict XIII, thus securing the election of Alexander V. At the Council of Constance, he was largely responsible for the success of its election method, which granted a vote to certain national delegates along with the cardinals. He is considered by some to be a precursor to both theological and political Gallicanism.  Simon died on 19 January 1423.  He was buried at the Poitiers Cathedral. 

His treatise  (1397), offering multiple lines of reasoning for bringing the Schism to an end, was edited by Howard Kaminsky in 1984. Simon argued that Benedict's followers could withdraw obedience to compel him to seek a solution to the Schism.

Notes

References

Kaminsky, Howard, Simon de Cramaud and the Great Schism (New Brunswick, NJ) 1983.
Kaminsky, Howard. "The Early Career of Simon De Cramaud". Speculum, vol. 49, no. 3, 1974, pp. 499–534., www.jstor.org/stable/2851753.
 Simon de Cramaud, De substraccione obediencie, ed. Howard Kaminsky, Cambridge, MA: the Medieval Academy of America, 1984.

1422 deaths
People from Haute-Vienne
15th-century French cardinals
Latin Patriarchs of Alexandria
Bishops of Agen
Bishops of Avignon
Bishops of Béziers
Bishops of Carcassonne
Bishops of Poitiers
Archbishops of Reims
Canon law jurists
Year of birth uncertain
15th-century peers of France